Barbara K Hodges (née Webber) (1893–1949) was an English novelist who wrote under the pseudonym Elizabeth Cambridge. The daughter of Dr H. W. Webber, she was born in Rickmansworth in Hertfordshire. She spent her childhood in Plymouth and Westgate-on-Sea, and then attended Les Marrioniers finishing school in Paris. Barbara published her first set of short stories at the age of 17.

In 1914, she worked as a Voluntary Aid Detachment nurse before marrying Dr. G. M. Hodges. The couple lived in Deddington and had two sons and a daughter. In 1930 she began writing again and Hostages to Fortune was published in 1933 (reprinted in 2003 by Persephone Books). She wrote five more novels between 1934 and 1940.

References

External links
Author profile at Persephone Books
Hostages to Fortune at Persephone Books

1893 births
1949 deaths
English women novelists
Pseudonymous women writers
20th-century English novelists
20th-century English women writers
Writers from Plymouth, Devon
People from Westgate-on-Sea
20th-century pseudonymous writers